Mirjami Heikkinen (born 1984) is a Finnish voice actress, who she has been voice-dubbing roles in the Finnish language for many foreign media, since 1999. She's good friends with Finnish voice actor Samuel Harjanne, since they have done voice roles together in many of the same dubbing productions that they were both involved in. Her best known voice-over roles include Blossom in The Powerpuff Girls, Kim Possible of the same character of the same title of the cartoon. In film, she was Finnish dubbing voice of Hermione Granger to the Harry Potter films and video games.

Filmography

Cartoons

Anime

Animated films

Video games

References

External links
 Mirjami Heikkinen at Voicechasers

1984 births
Living people
Finnish video game actresses
Finnish child actresses
Finnish voice actresses
21st-century Finnish actresses
20th-century Finnish actresses